Kuan Bi-ling (born 9 December 1956) is a Taiwanese politician. She is a member of the Democratic Progressive Party, currently serving as a member of the Legislative Yuan.

Kuan has been a national legislator since 2005, having won three consecutive elections, including the highly competitive 2008 legislative election after the introduction of the single-member district system which halved the total seats from 225 to 113.

Early life and education 
Kuan Bi-ling was born to a Hakka Taiwanese father and a Hoklo Taiwanese mother. She received her Ph.D. with honors in political science from National Taiwan University.

Early careers
 Director General, Kaohsiung City Bureau of Cultural Affairs
 Director General, Kaohsiung City Department of Information
 8th and 10th DPP Central Party Headquarters Central Executive Committee
 Deputy Director, President Chen Shui-Bian Knowledge Taiwan Election Campaign Group
 Spokesperson, Women's Headquarters, Mayor Chen Shui-bian Re-Election Campaign
 Spokesperson, Alliance for Supervision of Constitutional Reform
 Secretary General, Taiwan Association of University Professor
 Associate Professor, Department of Public Administration and Policy, National Taipei University

Political career
Kuan won the 2008 Republic of China legislative election held on 12 January 2008 representing Constituency 2 of Kaohsiung City.

Personal life
Kuan is married to Hsu Yang-ming.

Controversy

Physical confrontation in the Education and Culture Committee  
On 22 October 2008, Legislator Hung Hsiu-chu of the Chinese Nationalist Party injured an eye of Kuan’s parliament assistant (PA) while pushing a poster away during a budget review session of the National Science Council in the Education and Culture Committee, so Kuan stood up in argument with Hung till finally slapped Hung's face and Hung pinched Kuan's cheeks, and both legislators refused to apologize. Kuan states: "When one is faced with repression, one should stand straight, refuse to give in and fight against oppression and hegemony." Hung launched a lawsuit against Kuan for two years until a judge persuaded both sides to reconcile with each other, and shared chocolate together in peace on 29 July 2010.

Supporting the languages development act 

The 2018 Development of National Languages Act stipulates the government offices to provide the interpretation services for the citizens participating in administrative, legislative, and judicial procedures to freely choose to use their national languages, so the Legislative Yuan activated the interpreter service for the parliament session in real time accordingly. On 27 September 2021, after following the steps to apply in advance with 3 Taiwanese interpreters been present ready, Legislator Chen Po-wei of the Taiwan Statebuilding Party proceeded his scheduled questioning session in Taiwanese in the Foreign and National Defense Committee. Ministrer of National Defense, Chiu Kuo-cheng rejected to speak Taiwanese, nor accepted the interpreter's real-time service at site, but brought the deputy minister Zong-hsiao Li as his own interpreter, and insisted in the 3-way translation pattern sentence by sentence. Chiu repeatedly interrupted the question process by asking Chen to speak Mandarin Chinese for easier communication, or the session time cannot be lengthened to accommodate the interpretation, but Li is not a linguistic professional, hence his translation contains contextual errors, so Chairman Chen I-hsin intervened when the argument occurred, and introduced the existing synchronized interpretation in progress as the solution same as the common conference practice in the other states; but Chiu never picked up the earphone, yet insisted his way till the session run out of time.  Chen later apologized to the public for the good intention of practicing the national language law being turned into a linguistic communication tragedy, and condemned Chiu for "bullying", but Chiu denied the allegation and claimed that a language is a tool of communication.  The parliamentary interpretation service were temporarily suspended afterwards pending on better communication in the future - consequently Kuan, the other MPs and media editorials such as the Taipei Times commented that Language is not just a tool of communication as Chiu said, but also an identity of feelings and culture. Taipei City Councilor Miao Poya also explained that the multi-lingual working environment is essential for a healthy mind without the "Chinese Language Supremacy" attitude to achieve the international level in diversity, equality and mutual respect for a modern state.

References

Taiwanese politicians of Hakka descent
Democratic Progressive Party Members of the Legislative Yuan
Kaohsiung Members of the Legislative Yuan
National Taiwan University alumni
Living people
Politicians of the Republic of China on Taiwan from Taichung
21st-century Taiwanese women politicians
Academic staff of the National Taipei University
Members of the 6th Legislative Yuan
Members of the 7th Legislative Yuan
Members of the 8th Legislative Yuan
Members of the 9th Legislative Yuan
1956 births